The extinct Manguean languages were a branch of the Oto-Manguean family. They were Chorotega of Costa Rica and Nicaragua (where it was called Mangue or Monimbo), and Chiapanec of Mexico.

References

Oto-Manguean languages